Samuel Uziel was a Talmudist and scholar of the 17th century, rabbi of Livorno. He is mentioned in a responsum in the collection Mayim Rabbim  of Raphael Meldola.

References 

Uziel
Livornese Jews